The Benguet–Nueva Vizcaya Road, (also known as the Baguio–Aritao Road or Baguio–Nueva Vizcaya Road), is the road system that connects the provinces of Benguet and Nueva Vizcaya in the Philippines.

The entire road forms part of National Route 110 (N110) of the Philippine highway network. It traverses the municipalities of Aritao and Kayapa in Nueva Vizcaya, the municipalities of Bokod, Itogon, and La Trinidad in Benguet, and the city of Baguio.

Route description
The road is one of the major access roads to the city of Baguio for travelers coming from Nueva Vizcaya and the Cagayan Valley region. Measuring , it is also longer than Asin–Nangalisan–San Pascual Road, Aspiras–Palispis Highway (formerly Marcos Highway), Kennon Road, and Naguilian Road.

The road starts at the junction with Pan-Philippine Highway and Aritao–Quirino Road in Aritao, Nueva Vizcaya. It then enters the towns of Kayapa, also in Nueva Vizcaya, and Bokod, Itogon, and La Trinidad in Benguet. It passes through Ambuklao Dam, and generally follows the Santa Cruz River (a tributary of the Magat River) in Nueva Vizcaya and the Agno River in Benguet. It then enters the city of Baguio as Pacdal Road as it traverses barangay Pacdal. It ends at Pacdal Circle, a component of Leonard Wood Road near Wright Park.

History 
The road was expected to be completed by September 2006. It is an upgrade from the old road, making it an all-weather path. The road cost , and was a joint project by the Philippine government and the Japan Bank for International Cooperation.

Intersections

References

Roads in Benguet
Baguio
Roads in Nueva Vizcaya